Liu Suiji (born December 1956) is a former Chinese politician and police officer from Shanxi Province. Liu served as the Secretary of the Taiyuan Political and Legislative Affairs Committee (Zhengfawei), in addition to being the provincial capital's police chief. In August 2014 Liu was placed under investigation by the Communist Party's anti-corruption agency.

Education
Liu was born and raised in Pinglu County, Shanxi, he graduated from Lanzhou University in 1982, majoring in history.

Career
He entered politics in 1973 and joined the Chinese Communist Party (CCP) in July 1982.

After college, he was assigned to Taiyuan as an officer, serving in various administrative and political roles.

In 2006 he became a Standing Committee member of the CCP Taiyuan Committee and was elevated to the Secretary of Taiyuan Political and Legal Affairs Committee. He remained in that post until August 2014. He also served as the Party Secretary of Taiyuan Public Security Bureau between December 2012 to August 2014.

Investigation
On August 24, 2014, Liu Suiji was being investigated by the Central Commission for Discipline Inspection of the CCP for "serious violations of laws and regulations" and removed from his government posts by the Shanxi People's Government. His predecessor, Tian Yubao, was sacked for graft in November 2014. Liu was expelled from the party on December 3, 2015. In 2018, he was sentenced to 19 years for accepting bribes, holding a huge amount of property from an unidentified source and abusing his power. He was also fined 2 million yuan. His wife Wang Liping was sentenced to 3 years and fined 500,000 yuan.

References

1956 births
Living people
People's Republic of China politicians from Shanxi
Politicians from Yuncheng
Political office-holders in Shanxi
Lanzhou University alumni
Expelled members of the Chinese Communist Party
Chinese police officers
Chinese Communist Party politicians from Shanxi